Mathew John Cuthbert (born 21 September 1993) is a South African politician serving as the Shadow Deputy Minister of Trade and Industry since June 2019. A member of the Democratic Alliance, he was elected to the National Assembly in May 2019. Before that, Cuthbert served as a councillor in the Ekurhuleni Metropolitan Municipality.

Political career
Cuthbert is a member of the  Democratic Alliance. He served as a councillor and as the shadow mayoral committee member for economic development in the Ekurhuleni Metropolitan Municipality until his election to Parliament.

In March 2019, the Democratic Alliance announced their parliamentary candidates for the general election on 8 May. Cuthbert was placed 60th on the party's national list and 15th on the party's Gauteng regional list. After the election, he was announced as an incoming parliamentarian. He was sworn in on 22 May 2019. On 5 June 2019, the DA parliamentary leader, Mmusi Maimane, selected him to be the Shadow Deputy Minister of Trade and Industry. Cuthbert became a member of the Portfolio Committee on Trade and Industry on 27 June.

In 2020, Cuthbert supported Helen Zille's bid to be re-elected as chairperson of the DA's Federal Council, the party's second highest-decision making body. He also supported interim leader John Steenhuisen's leadership campaign. After Steenhuisen was elected leader for a full term, he kept Cuthbert in the Shadow Cabinet as Shadow Deputy Minister of Trade and Industry.

Personal life
Cuthbert is a cousin of AfriForum president Kallie Kriel. In an interview in May 2018, Kriel said that apartheid was not a crime against humanity. Cuthbert called his comment "disgusting".

References

External links
Mathew Cuthbert: The Daily Maverick
Mr Mathew John Cuthbert at Parliament of South Africa

Living people
1993 births
White South African people
People from Gauteng
Members of the National Assembly of South Africa
Democratic Alliance (South Africa) politicians